Chishimba Kambwili (born 3 June 1969) is a former member of the National Assembly of Zambia for Roan Constituency (2006 - 2019) in Luanshya District. He has also held several posts in the cabinet. He is the former leader of the National Democratic Congress.

He was born in Luanshya where he subsequently completed his education. Kambwili was also the National Youth Chairman for the Patriotic Front until December 2015.

Kambwili was first appointed Minister of Foreign affairs however was then moved to Minister of Labour, then Minister of Sports and Youth and later Minister of Information and Broadcasting Services. He was also the spokesperson of the Patriotic Front government during his tenure.

In August 2015, Kambwili had threatened to fire the Zambia National Broadcasting Corporation after the agency started protesting his MP practices and by October of the same year revoked the license of Lusaka's Radio Phoenix, after assuming that some of their staff were supporting United Party for National Development candidates because there was absence of callers-in one of the station's programs.

In the 2016 election Kambwili retained his MP seat from Roan Constituency and continued to serve as the Minister of Information and Broadcasting services in President Lungu's second cabinet.

On 8 November 2016 President Lungu fired Kambwili as Information Minister a few days after the president threatened to deal with corrupt officials in his Cabinet.

In 2017 he was expelled from the party along with Mwenya Musenge for destabilization reports.

In 2018 Chishimba Kambwili was accused of using abusive language toward Zambian police and soldiers. On 23 March 2018 he was rushed to the University Teaching Hospital after collapsing at the Woodlands Police Station and was discharged from there a week later.
On 27 February 2019 his seat was declared vacant by the Speaker of the National Assembly.

On 30 June 2020, Kambwili called on opposition parties in Zambia to form a grand opposition alliance ahead of the 2021 Zambian general election, citing the example of the 2020 Malawian presidential election.

In October 2020, Chishimba Kambwili was sentenced to prison for "forgery" by the Lusaka Court of First Instance. "In the first count, the convict was sentenced to 12 months and an additional 12 months for disseminating false documents," Magistrate David Simu Samba said in his judgment. Both sentences will be executed simultaneously. He was acquitted of a charge of giving false information to an official.

References

Living people
Members of the National Assembly of Zambia
People from Luanshya
Foreign Ministers of Zambia
Labour and Social Security ministers of Zambia
Sport, Youth and Child Development ministers of Zambia
Information and Broadcasting Services ministers of Zambia
1969 births